Empress of the Sui dynasty may refer to:

 Empress Dugu (r. 581-602), the wife of Emperor Wen
 Empress Xiao (Sui dynasty) (r. 605-618), the wife of Emperor Yang